The men's 100 metres at the 2016 European Athletics Championships took place at the Olympic Stadium on 6 and 7 July. The event will consist of three rounds, Preliminary, semi-final and final, with the top nine ranked athletes automatically entered at the semi-final stage.

Records

Schedule

Results

Round 1

First 3 in each heat (Q) and the next fastest 4 (q) advance to the Semifinals. 9 fastest entrants awarded bye to Semifinals.

Wind:Heat 1: +0.5 m/s, Heat 2: +0.8 m/s, Heat 3: +1.9 m/s, Heat 4: +0.6 m/s

Semifinals 

First 2 (Q) and next 2 fastest (q) qualify for the final.

Wind:Heat 1: +1.5 m/s, Heat 2: +0.6 m/s, Heat 3: -0.4 m/s

*Athletes who received a bye to the semifinals

Final 
Wind: 0.0 m/s

References

External links
 amsterdam2016.org, official championship site

100 M
100 metres at the European Athletics Championships